René Toft Hansen (born 1 November 1984) is a Danish professional handballer for Bjerringbro-Silkeborg Håndbold and the Denmark national team. His brother Henrik also plays handball for Denmark national team.

Career
Hansen had his first game with the Denmark national team in 2005.

Hansen is European Champion with the Danes, after winning the 2012 Championship in Serbia, defeating the host nation in the final, 21–19. Also, he won the silver medal at the World Men's Handball Championship in 2013 in Spain (after losing to Spain 35–19) and in 2011 in Sweden (after losing to France in the overtime 35–37)

Hansen moved to THW Kiel for the 2012–2013 season. He was named the new captain for THW Kiel beginning in the 2015–16 season, after Filip Jícha's transfer to FC Barcelona.

Individual awards
All-Star Line Player of the European Championship: 2012
Best Defender of the EHF Champions League: 2015

Honours
Danish Championship:
: 2009, 2011, 2012
: 2007, 2010, 2021
: 2022
Danish Cup:
: 2011
German Championship:
: 2013, 2014, 2015
German Cup:
: 2013

References

External links

1984 births
Living people
Danish male handball players
Viborg HK players
KIF Kolding players
THW Kiel players
Handball-Bundesliga players
Veszprém KC players
S.L. Benfica handball players
Handball players at the 2012 Summer Olympics
Handball players at the 2016 Summer Olympics
Olympic handball players of Denmark
Medalists at the 2016 Summer Olympics
Olympic gold medalists for Denmark
Olympic medalists in handball
Expatriate handball players
Danish expatriate sportspeople in Germany
Danish expatriate sportspeople in Hungary
Danish expatriate sportspeople in Portugal
People from Skive Municipality
Sportspeople from the Central Denmark Region